Thordisa is a genus of sea slugs, dorid nudibranchs, shell-less marine gastropod mollusks in the family Discodorididae.

Species 
Species in the genus Thordisa include:
 Thordisa aculeata Ortea & Valdés, 1995
 Thordisa albomacula Chan & Gosliner, 2007
 Thordisa aurea Pruvot-Fol, 1951
 Thordisa azmanii Cervera & García-Gómez, 1989
 Thordisa bimaculata Lance, 1966
 Thordisa burnupi Eliot, 1910
 Thordisa diuda Marcus Er., 1955
 Thordisa filix Pruvot-Fol, 1951
 Thordisa harrisi Chan & Gosliner, 2006
 Thordisa hilaris Bergh, 1905
 Thordisa ladislavii (Ihering, 1886)
 Thordisa lurca (Ev. Marcus & Er. Marcus, 1967)
 Thordisa luteola Chan & Gosliner, 2007
 Thordisa nieseni Chan & Gosliner, 2007
 Thordisa oliva Chan & Gosliner, 2007
 Thordisa pallida Bergh, 1884
 Thordisa poplei Edmunds, 2011
 Thordisa rubescens Behrens & Henderson, 1981
 Thordisa sanguinea Baba, 1955
 Thordisa tahala Chan & Gosliner, 2007
 Thordisa verrucosa (Crosse in Angas, 1864)
 Thordisa villosa (Alder & Hancock, 1864)
Species brought into synonymy
 Thordisa crosslandi Eliot, 1903 : synonym of Sebadoris nubilosa (Pease, 1871)
 Thordisa parva Baba, 1938 : synonym of Jorunna parva (Baba, 1938)
 Thordisa sabulosa Burn, 1957 : synonym of Thordisa verrucosa (Crosse in Angas, 1864)

References

External links 

Discodorididae